Daniel Brud (born 20 May 1989 in Kraków) is a Polish footballer who plays for Flota Świnoujście as a midfielder.

Career

Club
He made his debut for Wisła Kraków in Ekstraklasa on 15 April 2011 in a match against GKS Bełchatów.

Statistics
 (correct as of 3 June 2013)

Honours

SC Freiburg
 Under 19 Fußball-Bundesliga: 2007–08

Wisła Kraków
 Ekstraklasa: 2010–11

References

External links
 

Polish footballers
Wisła Kraków players
ŁKS Łódź players
1989 births
Living people
Footballers from Kraków
Association football midfielders